In telecommunication, the term gating has the following meanings:

The process of selecting only those portions of a wave between specified time intervals or between specified amplitude limits.
The controlling of signals by means of combinational logic elements.
A process in which a predetermined set of conditions, when established, permits a second process to occur.

Telecommunications engineering
Signal processing